Dendrelaphis tristis (Common bronzeback or Daudin's bronzeback) is a species of tree-snake found in Sri Lanka, India, Bangladesh, Pakistan, Nepal, Myanmar, and Bhutan.

Description
Dendrelaphis tristis is a long, slender snake with a pointed head and a bronze coloured line running right down its back. Its diet includes geckos, birds and occasionally frogs. This harmless snake prefers the tree tops to life on the ground.  It is camouflaged (made invisible by means of protective coloring) among the leaves because of its uniform ruddy brown skin.  This active snake is restless and quick, both on the ground as well as in the trees. Generally a lively and plucky snake, its disposition varies from one example to another.  It is found in southern India and the Himalayan foothills. This oviparous (egg laying animal e.g. birds) snake lays its eggs between September and February. The 6–7 eggs in a clutch, or number of eggs laid at once, hatch 4–6 weeks after laying; that is, they have a gestation period of 4–6 weeks.

Gallery

References 
 Boulenger, George A. 1890 The Fauna of British India, Including Bangladesh, Ceylon and Burma. Reptilia and Batrachia. Taylor & Francis, London, xviii, 541 pp.
 Daudin, F. M. 1803 Histoire Naturelle Generale et Particuliere des Reptiles. Vol. 6. F. Dufart, Paris.

External links 
 
 https://web.archive.org/web/20040907175725/http://itgmv1.fzk.de/www/itg/uetz/herp/photos/DENDRELAPHIS_TRISTIS.JPG 

Colubrids
Snakes of Asia
Reptiles of India
Reptiles of Sri Lanka
Reptiles described in 1803
tristis